Vladimirovka is a rural locality (a village) in Sudskoye Rural Settlement, Cherepovetsky District, Vologda Oblast, Russia. The population was 42 as of 2002. There are 7 streets.

Geography 
Vladimirovka is located 36 km northwest of Cherepovets (the district's administrative centre) by road. Krivets is the nearest rural locality.

References 

Rural localities in Cherepovetsky District